Anthonie Peter de Graaff (Amsterdam, 12 April 1928 – Waalwijk, 4 January 2008) was a Dutch writer.

The author, who himself served in the Dutch East Indies from March 1949 to the beginning of October 1950 as sergeant combat medic of the 425th Infantry Battalion, has written twenty books about the issues faced by the soldiers (mainly conscripts) who were sent to the East Indies during the politionele acties in the wake of World War II.

De Graaff's best known work is the book De heren worden bedankt, with a total of seven editions. With his books, De Graaff had become a mouthpiece for many Dutch veterans of the Indonesian War of Independence and he exposed abuses that happened to Dutch soldiers during and after the conflict.

In 1995, a reconciliation trip by De Graaff to Indonesia, which also involved talks with former enemies, led to commotion among his veteran audience.

In 2000, De Graaff was knighted in the Order of Orange-Nassau. In 2007 he was awarded the Kolonel J.L.H.A. Antoni Waardering by the Ministry of Defense for his books.

De Graaff died on 4 January 2008 of a cerebral infarction, aged 79. His 19th book (Eindelijk erkenning) was published in the spring of 2008. De Graaff's 20th and last book, of which he had written 56 pages at the time of his death, was published posthumously in January 2009. Its title is Vaarwel, kameraad!

Published works
De heren worden bedankt: met het vergeten leger in Indië, 1949–1950. 1986. 
De weg terug: het vergeten leger toen en nu. 1988. 
Brieven uit het veld: het vergeten leger thuis. 1989. 
De heren worden bedankt; De weg terug; Brieven uit het veld. 1990.  (a hardcover bundle of De Graaff's first three books)
Met de T.N.I. op stap: de laatste patrouille van het vergeten leger. 1991. 
Notities van een soldaat: het dagboek van soldaat A.A. van der Heiden. 1994. 
Zeg, Hollands soldaat… 1995. 
Merdeka. 1995. 
Vertel het je kinderen, veteraan! 1999. 
Levenslang op patrouille. 2000. 
De laatste patrouille. 2001. 
Op patrouille in blessuretijd. 2001. 
Indië-veteraan ben je levenslang. 2002. 
Indië blijft ons bezighouden. 2003. 
Indië vergeet je nooit! 2004. 
Indië bepaalde ons leven. 2004. 
Indonesië als eindstation. 2005. 
Leven in twee werelden. 2007. 
Indië blijft onze denkwereld. 2007. 
Eindelijk erkenning. 2008. 
Vaarwel, kameraad! 2009.

References

1928 births
2008 deaths
Dutch male writers
Dutch veterans' rights activists
Indonesianists
Knights of the Order of Orange-Nassau
Royal Netherlands East Indies Army personnel
Writers from Amsterdam